Sygkentrosou (Concentrate) is the second album released by popular Greek singer, Kelly Kelekidou. It was released in Greece in November 2006 by Sony BMG Greece.

Track listing
 "Sygkentrosou" (La Azon) - 3:10
 "Brosta Sou Tha Me Vriskis" - 3:41
 "Tha'rthi I Ora Sou" - 3:16
 "De Me Skeftese" - 3:15
 "Agapi Thelo Mono" - 3:19
 "Lathos Agapi" - 3:41
 "An Se Haso Tha Hatho" - 3:32
 "Me Edeses Me Ta Magia Sou" - 3:18
 "Gineka Erotevmeni" - 4:05
 "Mes Stin Trela Mou" - 3:53
 "Ma To Theo" (Bonus Track) - 3:27

References

2006 albums
Greek-language albums
Kelly Kelekidou albums
Sony Music Greece albums